The William and Mary Farnum House was an historic house located at 4 Albee Road, Uxbridge, Massachusetts, United States.  The  story brick house was built in 1821, and was a fine local example of Federal style architecture.  The house may have originally been built for the grandchildren of Moses Farnum, a prominent early settler of the area.

]</ref>

See also
National Register of Historic Places listings in Uxbridge, Massachusetts

References

Houses in Uxbridge, Massachusetts
National Register of Historic Places in Uxbridge, Massachusetts
Houses on the National Register of Historic Places in Worcester County, Massachusetts